Ross Township, Illinois may refer to one of the following townships:

 Ross Township, Edgar County, Illinois
 Ross Township, Pike County, Illinois
 Ross Township, Vermilion County, Illinois

See also

Ross Township (disambiguation)

Illinois township disambiguation pages